"Grace Kelly" is the second single by British singer Mika. It is the opening track on Mika's debut studio album Life in Cartoon Motion (2007). Produced and mixed by Greg Wells, the song entered the UK Singles Chart at number three and the UK Official Download Chart at number one. One week later, it jumped to the top of the UK Singles Chart on download sales alone. The track was number one on the UK Singles Chart for five weeks, and ended 2007 as the year's third biggest-selling single in that country. In the US, "Grace Kelly" was made available for digital download on 16 January 2007. This song was also No. 89 on MTV Asias list of Top 100 Hits of 2007. It was designed to be a mocking satire of musicians who try to reinvent themselves to be popular.

The song is titled after Academy Award-winning American film and stage actress, and Princess of Monaco, Grace Kelly. The bit of dialogue used in the song is from the film The Country Girl, which stars Kelly. Mika claims the song was inspired after a bad experience with a record company executive, in which he was told to be more like Craig David. The lyric "So I tried a little Freddie" is a reference to Queen's Freddie Mercury, to whose singing voice Mika's has been compared. On at least one occasion, Mika confirmed that he used the main melody from Figaro's famous aria "Largo al factotum", from the opera The Barber of Seville by Gioachino Rossini. Mika performed the song at the MTV Europe Music Awards 2007 in Munich and at the 2008 BRIT Awards at the Earls Court Exhibition Centre, London, where it was nominated for Best British Single, but lost to "Shine" by Take That. The song has sold over 630,000 copies in the UK, as stated by the Official Charts Company.

Background and composition 

Mika wrote the song after he felt frustrated with record label executives that wanted him to change his sound to fit the common pop mold. In the song, Mika points out how he can pretend to be anyone he likes to win approval – in this case the glamorous actress Grace Kelly. He wrote the song after the record company told him that they wanted to model his look and sound on Craig David, who was popular at the time in the UK. Mika rejected this idea and wrote "Grace Kelly" as a way of expressing his individuality. The song's melody is based on the aria "Largo al factotum", from the opera The Barber of Seville by Gioachino Rossini.

Critical reception 
The song received positive reviews from music critics. Heather Phares from AllMusic wrote a positive review for the song, stating that "Mika's singles are his most charming moments, including the instant sunshine of "Grace Kelly," which crams tap-dancing rhythms, filmic dialogue, Elton's pianos, Freddie's vocal harmonies, and Brian May's guitars into just over three minutes." Christian John Wikane from PopMatters wrote an extensive article about the comparisons between Mika and Freddie Mercury, writing that "he sounds a lot like Mercury and wears the influence like a badge of honor, even name-checking the late front man of Queen in the first verse. Mika vacillates between the affected theatricality of Mercury's full-throttled voice and his own strong falsetto, where he earnestly implores "Why don't you like me?" no less than 12 times.

Beth Johnson from Entertainment Weekly wrote that "Nothing quite matches the crystal-shattering exuberance of hit Grace Kelly." John Murphy from musicOMH wrote that "It's big, joyous, dumb pop, and the only danger with it is that you'll be utterly sick of it fast." Lizzie Enever from BBC Music was direct, writing that "Grace Kelly is a great pop song – it's catchy, you can't help singing along and it grates on you after a few days when you can't get it out of your head but you still go back for more – flawless credentials." Graham Griffith, also from About.com, wrote that the song "is an outrageously irresistible and infectious pop gem." Dom Passantino from Stylus Magazine criticized the track, writing that "it seems to suggest the boy has some level for musicals, being as it is all Broadway flittering and hackneyed attempts at conveying a story with its lyrics. But here's the problem: he's got no tales to tell, just a tab at his local make-up supplier. "Am I too dirty, am I too flirty?" he sings at one point."

Accolades 
At the 2007 World Music Awards, Mika won for Best Selling British Artist, Best Selling New Artist, Best Selling Male Entertainer, and World's Best Selling Pop Rock Male Artist.

Live performances and covers
Top 50 contestant of American Idol Josiah Leming performed a rendition of the song in Hollywood for the judges, which received great praise.
A version by Mika appears on the 2007 compilation album The Saturday Sessions: The Dermot O'Leary Show.
Mika performed this song on series 4 episode 3 of The Friday Night Project on 19 January 2007. James Nesbitt was the host that night.
The Whiffenpoofs performed the song on The Sing-Off on 6 December 2010.
Bindi Irwin and Derek Hough performed the song on Dancing with the Stars (U.S. season 21)
Josef Fečo performed the song on The Voice Česko Slovensko on 1 March 2019
In September 2021, TikTok users, including Ryan Reynolds and Will Ferrell, took part in a challenge where the user records the different vocal parts of the chorus on top of each other making a full harmony.
In May 2022, Mika performed this song as part of the interval medley at the Eurovision Song Contest 2022, which he co-hosted.

Parodies
Rory Bremner recorded a parody version to illustrate the problems of UK Prime Minister Gordon Brown.
Amateur Transplants's song "Libel Case" from their 2008 album Unfit to Practise.
Subwoolfer released a parody song of Mika's "Grace Kelly" titled "Space Kelly" a parody Eurovision round-up song of their competitors and making light of their true identities.

Appearances
The Hills
Ugly Betty
A Turkish Coca-Cola advertisement 
An Israeli advertisement of "Misdar Zihoi"
A trailer for Disney Cinemagic
A trailer for I Now Pronounce You Chuck and Larry
A trailer for The Ugly Truth
The 2008 episode of Silent Witness "Lost Child", as a 27-year-old transforms himself into a schoolboy
An advertisement for Neighbours
What Happens in Vegas...
Dead Set
The Doctor Who novel "The Pirate Loop"
The Sarah Jane Adventures episode "The Mark of the Berserker"
An episode of Celebrity Big Brother
An advertisement of Confessions of a Shopaholic
Autumn 2007 episodes of Corazón de Otoño
The European Nintendo DS version of Band Hero
A German first season trailer for Weeds
The adult-oriented Wii game We Dare, as a cover version
FC Barcelona's official video for Thierry Henry in Barca Legends series

Music video
The music video for the song "Grace Kelly" was directed by Sophie Muller and starred Mika and future singer-songwriter Mae Muller (no relation to the director). The video was filmed in early November 2006 and has been nominated for numerous worldwide awards. The instrumental introduction in the video is an extract of the acoustic version of the song found on certain releases of the album.

Track listing
Australian CD single
 "Grace Kelly" – 3:08
 "Grace Kelly" (Linus Loves Radio Edit) – 3:20
 "Over My Shoulder" – 4:44
 "Grace Kelly" (Video)

UK CD single
 "Grace Kelly" – 3:08
 "Grace Kelly" (Linus Loves Radio Edit) – 3:20
 "Over My Shoulder" – 4:44

Limited edition 7" vinyl
 "Grace Kelly" – 3:07
 "Satellite" – 4:15

UK 12" vinyl
 "Grace Kelly" (Linus Loves Full Vocal Remix) – 6:46
 "Grace Kelly" (Linus Loves Dub Remix) – 6:40
 "Grace Kelly" (Tom Neville Full Vocal Remix) – 6:48
 "Grace Kelly" (Tom Neville Dub Remix) – 7:08

Official versions
"Grace Kelly" – 3:07
"Grace Kelly" (Acoustic Version) – 3:07
"Grace Kelly" (Bimbo Jones Remix Edit) – 3:00
"Grace Kelly" (Bimbo Jones Remix) – 6:26
"Grace Kelly" (Les Grandes Gueules Version) – 3:07
"Grace Kelly" (Linus Loves Radio Edit) – 3:20
"Grace Kelly" (Linus Loves Full Vocal Remix) – 6:46
"Grace Kelly" (Linus Loves Dub Remix) – 6:40
"Grace Kelly" (Pull Tiger Tail Remix) – 4:26
"Grace Kelly" (Tom Neville Full Vocal Remix) – 6:48
"Grace Kelly" (Tom Neville Dub Remix) – 7:08

Chart performance 
It reached number one in the United Kingdom and in Ireland. The song was only the second single ever to top the UK chart without selling a physical copy ("Crazy" by Gnarls Barkley was the first). In the US market, it peaked at number 57 on the Billboard Hot 100. The December 2007 Observer Music Monthly asked Mika how it felt getting to No. 1 in the UK with this song. He replied: "Very unreal. It still feels unreal. It's just a song I wrote in my room. By the time I'd written 'Grace Kelly' everything in my life had been called into question. Trying to find out what I was going to do with my life, trying to be a musician, to be independent, to give myself the remote chance of any kind of a relationship. I was just sorting every thing out in my head. That song sums it all up." It went to #1 on the United Kingdom, Czech Republic, Ireland, Italy, Norway and Turkey singles charts. The song was 82 in the French physical charts but number 2 in digital ones, and has more than 50,000 sales in the country. The song has more than 5 million sales.

Charts

Weekly charts

Year-end charts

Decade-end charts

Certifications

See also
List of number-one hits in Denmark
List of number-one singles of 2007 (Ireland)
List of number-one hits of 2007 (Italy)
List of number-one hits in Norway
List of number-one singles from the 2000s (UK)

References

External links
 

2007 singles
Mika (singer) songs
Music videos directed by Sophie Muller
Irish Singles Chart number-one singles
Number-one singles in Denmark
Number-one singles in Italy
Number-one singles in Norway
Number-one singles in Scotland
Number-one singles in Spain
Number-one singles in Turkey
UK Singles Chart number-one singles
Songs written by Mika (singer)
Song recordings produced by Greg Wells
Songs written by Jodi Marr
2007 songs
Island Records singles
Casablanca Records singles
Cultural depictions of Grace Kelly
Songs about actors
Songs about princesses